Peter Power (born 26 January 1966) is a former Irish Fianna Fáil politician. He was a Teachta Dála (TD) for the Limerick East constituency from 2002 to 2011, and served as Minister of State for Overseas Development from 2008 to 2011. He has been executive director of UNICEF Ireland .

Early and private life
Power was born in Limerick, but moved to Dublin after losing his seat at the 2011 general election. He was educated at JFK Memorial School, Ardscoil Rís and University College Cork (UCC). Previous to his election as a TD he worked as a solicitor at Holmes O'Malley Sexton in Limerick.

Political career
Power first contested national elections at the 1997 general election but was unsuccessful on this attempt.

He contested the 1999 local elections in the No. 1 electoral area of Limerick City Council and was the only Fianna Fáil candidate across all four areas to top the poll and become a Limerick City Councillor. Michael Ryan was co-opted in his place in 2003 due to the abolition of the dual mandate.

He was elected to Dáil Éireann at the 2002 general election as a Fianna Fáil TD.  He was re-elected at the 2007 general election.

He chaired the Joint Oireachtas Child Protection Committee established by the Oireachtas following the fall-out surrounding the May 2006 Supreme Court judgement in the CC Case. The Committee was convened in July 2006 and made its report in November of the same year. Power also served as a member of the Justice and Transportation committees.

In May 2008, he was appointed as Minister of State for Overseas Development and re-appointed by Taoiseach Brian Cowen on 22 April 2009 following the reduction in the number of Ministers of State from 20 to 15 in which seven serving ministers were not re-appointed.

He lost his seat at the 2011 general election.

In December 2011 Power was appointed executive director of UNICEF Ireland.

References

1966 births
Living people
Alumni of University College Cork
Fianna Fáil TDs
Local councillors in County Limerick
Members of the 29th Dáil
Members of the 30th Dáil
Ministers of State of the 30th Dáil
People associated with the University of Limerick
Politicians from Limerick (city)
People educated at Ardscoil Rís, Limerick